A Post Office stowage van is a type of rail vehicle built for use in a travelling post office (TPO).  Several of these have passed into preservation as they are very useful for storage on the railways.

Preservation
The preserved stowage vehicles are as follows:

In addition, 80421 was also purchased for preservation by the Embsay and Bolton Abbey Steam Railway, but was scrapped in July 2008.

Pre-Nationalisation TPO Stowage Vehicles:

References

British Rail coaching stock